Shane Cable (born 21 February 1970) is a former Australian rules footballer who played with the West Coast Eagles in the Victorian Football League (VFL).

Football career 
Cable, a Noongar man, is the son of AFL Hall of Famer Barry Cable. He made just one appearance with West Coast, at the WACA Ground in a win over Footscray where he had seven disposals. A wingman, he had initially been listed as an emergency but was named in the team after Chris Waterman was omitted for being late to a team meeting.

He played for Perth at WAFL level and represented the Indigenous All-Stars in 1994. In both 1993 and 1995 he topped the goal-kicking lists at Perth. Ten seasons later, he stood in for one match as coach of East Perth when regular Royals coach Warren Mahony was so ill due to a flu epidemic that he could not speak.

In 2004, Cable launched an Australian rules football magazine, Westside Football, covering the AFL and WAFL.

Post-football career 
Cable worked for mining company Rio Tinto. In 2016, he was appointed CEO of Indigenous Construction Resource Group (ICRG), an indigenous contractor set up to create job opportunities in the resources sector for regional Aboriginal communities. ICRG went into liquidation in May 2019. Cable later co-owned Resource Operations and Maintenance Services (ROMS).

References

External links
 
 

1970 births
Indigenous Australian players of Australian rules football
West Coast Eagles players
Peel Thunder Football Club coaches
Perth Football Club players
Living people
Australian rules footballers from Western Australia
Noongar people